Hamar people (also spelled Hamer) are a community inhabiting southwestern Ethiopia. They live in Hamer woreda (or district), a fertile part of the Omo River valley, in the Debub Omo Zone of the Southern Nations, Nationalities, and Peoples Region (SNNPR).  They are largely pastoralists, so their culture places a high value on cattle.

Demographics
The 2003 national census reported 46,532 people in this ethnic group, of whom 10,000 were urban inhabitants. The vast majority (99.13%) live in the SNNPR.

According to the Ethiopian national census of 1994, there were 42,838 Hamer language speakers, and 42,448 self-identified Hamer people, representing approximately 0.1% of the total Ethiopian population.

Culture

The Hamar are known for their unique custom of "bull jumping," which initiates a boy into manhood. First, female relatives dance and invite whipping from men who have recently been initiated; this shows their support of the initiate, and their scars give them a say on who they marry.

The boy must run back and forth twice across the backs of a row of bulls or castrated steers, and is ridiculed if he fails.

The men of the tribe will often style their hair with clay, creating a sculpture of sorts that is styled with various pigments, mostly red and white, and in smoothing the clay they create very small protruding tube in which they house ostrich feathers from their hunts.

The Assistant Administrator of Hamer Bena, Ato Imnet Gashab, has commented that only seven tribal members have ever completed secondary education.

Mingi, in the religion of the Hamar and related tribes, is the state of being impure or "ritually polluted". A person, often a child, who was considered mingi is killed by forced permanent separation from the tribe by being left alone in the jungle or by drowning in the river.

See also
Hamer language

References

Further reading
Lydall, Jean, and Ivo Strecker (1979). The Hamar of Southern Ethiopia. In three volumes: v. 1.: Work journal; v. 2: Baldambe explains; v. 3: Conversations in Dambaiti. Arbeiten aus dem Institut fur Volkerkunde der Universitat zu Göttingen, Bd. 12-14. Hohenschaftlarn: Klaus Renner Verlag.  (v. 1);  (v. 2);  (v. 3).
Giansanti, Gianni (2004). Vanishing Africa. Text and photographs by Gianni Giansanti; ethnographic introductions by Paolo Novaresio. Translated from Italian. With audio CD. Vercelli, Italy: White Star. .
Strecker, Ivo A. (1988). The Social Practice of Symbolization: An Anthropological Analysis. Monographs on Social Anthropology, no. 60. London; Atlantic Highlands, New Jersey: Athlone Press. .

Films
1973 - Rivers of Sand by Robert Gardner color, 83 min
1994 - Sweet Sorghum: An Ethnographer's Daughter Remembers Life in Hamar, Southern Ethiopia: a film by Ivo Strecker and Jean Lydall and their daughter Kaira Strecker. A production of IWF. Watertown, Massachusetts: Documentary Educational Resources, [released c. 1997]. VHS. Presenter/narrator, Kaira Strecker; producer, Rolf Husmann.
1996 release - "The Hamar Trilogy." A series of three films by Joanna Head and Jean Lydell; distributed by Filmakers Library, NYC. Titles in the series are: The Women Who Smile, Two Girls Go Hunting and Our Way of Loving.
2001 - Duka's Dilemma: A Visit to Hamar, Southern Ethiopia. A film by Jean Lydall and Kaira Strecker. Watertown, Massachusetts: Documentary Educational Resources, released in 2004. DVD. Camera, sound, and editing, Kaira Strecker; anthropology and production, Jean Lydall.
2001 - The Last Warriors: The Hamar and Karo Tribes: Searching for Mingi. A Trans Media production; Southern Star. Princeton, New Jersey: Films for the Humanities & Sciences. VHS. From The Last Warriors: Seven Tribes on the Verge of Extinction. Series producer/executive producer, Michael Willesee Jr.; writer/director, Ben Ulm. .

Discography
2003 - Nyabole: Hamar – Southern Ethiopia. CD. Museum collection Berlin series. Recorded between 1770 and 1776 and originally published on LP 1768. Mainz, Germany: Wergo.

External links

The Hamar People of the Omo Valley, also known as the Hamer People
Hamer page from BBC
People of Africa
Discovery channel
Video of Hamer village market - YouTube
Video of bull jumping - YouTube
Photos taken of members of the Hamar tribe, February 2010
Hamer and people of Omo Valley (Photos from Jean Buet)  

Ethnic groups in Ethiopia